W4 may refer to:
 Form W-4, an American tax form
 Heart Nebula or Westerhout 4, an interstellar cloud in Cassiopeia 
 London W4, a postcode district in west London, England
 W4 (nuclear warhead), a planned variant of the 1949–1953 Mark 4 nuclear bomb
 W4, complete oxidation of metal, a degree of meteorite weathering
 WLLZ (FM), a radio station in Detroit, USA, known as W4 from 1966 to 2000
 WWWW-FM or W4 Country, a country music radio station in Ann Arbor, USA
 LC Perú, a Peruvian airline (IATA airline designator W4)
 Warwick W-4 Hot Canary, a racing biplane 
 W4 tram, a class of electric trams built by the Melbourne & Metropolitan Tramways Board.

See also 
 4W (disambiguation)